Dimitrios Karabatis (22 September 1899 – 3 September 1964) was a Greek athlete. He competed in the 1920, 1924 and the 1928 Summer Olympics.

References

External links
 

1899 births
1964 deaths
Athletes (track and field) at the 1920 Summer Olympics
Athletes (track and field) at the 1924 Summer Olympics
Athletes (track and field) at the 1928 Summer Olympics
Greek male sprinters
Greek male shot putters
Greek male discus throwers
Olympic athletes of Greece
Sportspeople from İzmir
Smyrniote Greeks
20th-century Greek people